Dan McCarthy may refer to:
 Dan McCarthy (vibraphonist), Canadian jazz vibraphone player
 Daniel McCarthy (politician) (died 1957), Irish politician
 Dan McCarthy (ice hockey) (born 1958), Canadian hockey player
 Dan McCarthy (JAG), captain in the United States Navy
 Daniel McCarthy (producer) (died 2013), Canadian television producer
 Daniel M. McCarthy (1888–1950), American Democratic politician and lawyer
 Dan McCarthy (hurler) (born 1918), Irish hurler
 Daniel W. McCarthy (born 1955), composer
 Daniel Mac Carthy Glas (1807 – 1884), Historian and biographer